Awards and decorations of the United States government are civilian awards of the U.S. federal government which are typically issued for sustained meritorious service, in a civilian capacity, while serving in the U.S. federal government.  Certain U.S. government awards may also be issued to military personnel of the United States Armed Forces and be worn in conjunction with awards and decorations of the United States military. In order of precedence, those U.S. non-military awards and decorations authorized for wear are worn after U.S. military personal decorations and unit awards and before U.S. military campaign and service awards.

The following is a selection of civilian awards which are presently issued by the U.S. government.

Office of the President of the United States
 Presidential Medal of Freedom with Distinction
 Presidential Medal of Freedom
 Presidential Citizens Medal
 Public Safety Officer Medal of Valor
 Medal for Merit (no longer awarded)
 Medal of Freedom (no longer awarded)
 President's Award for Distinguished Federal Civilian Service
 National Medal of Arts
 National Humanities Medal
 National Medal of Science
 National Medal of Technology and Innovation
 Presidential Award for Excellence in Mathematics and Science Teaching
 Presidential Early Career Award for Scientists and Engineers (PECASE)
 Presidential Award for Leadership in Federal Energy Management
 Preserve America Presidential Award
 President's Environmental Youth Award
 President's Volunteer Service Award (PVSA)

Senior Executive Service
 Presidential Rank Award of Distinguished Executive
 Presidential Rank Award of Meritorious Executive
 Presidential Rank Award of Distinguished Senior Professional
 Presidential Rank Award of Meritorious Senior Professional

United States Congress
 Congressional Gold Medal
 Congressional Silver Medal
 Congressional Bronze Medal
 Congressional Award Gold Medal (Youth Only)
 Congressional Award Silver Medal (Youth Only)
 Congressional Award Bronze Medal (Youth Only)
 Congressional Gold Certificate (Youth Only)
 Congressional Silver Certificate (Youth Only)
 Congressional Bronze Certificate (Youth Only)

United States Intelligence Community
The National Intelligence Awards (NIA) Program is administered by the Office of the Director of National Intelligence for the United States Intelligence Community (IC).

National Intelligence Community Awards

Significant contribution awards
 George Washington Spymaster Award
 National Intelligence Cross
 National Intelligence Medal for Valor
 National Intelligence Distinguished Service Medal
 National Intelligence Superior Service Medal
 National Intelligence Reform Medal (Retired 11/2010)
 National Intelligence Exceptional Achievement Medal
 National Intelligence Meritorious Unit Citation
 National Intelligence Medallion
 National Intelligence Certificate of Distinction
 Director of National Intelligence's Award for Collaborative Leadership (Retired 11/2010)
 National Intelligence Special Act or Service Award
 Intelligence Community EEO and Diversity Exemplary Leadership Award
 Intelligence Community EEO and Diversity Outstanding Achievement Award
 Intelligence Community Seal Medallion
 Galileo Award

National Intelligence Public Service Awards
 National Intelligence Distinguished Public Service Medal
 National Intelligence Superior Public Service Medal

Special eligibility awards
 Intelligence Community Expeditionary Service Medal
 National Intelligence Joint Duty Service Device
 Senior National Intelligence Service Device

Former award prior to establishment of the NIA Program
 National Security Medal
 National Intelligence Medal of Achievement (NIAM)

Central Intelligence Agency

CIA Awards
 Distinguished Intelligence Cross (Valor Award)
 Distinguished Intelligence Medal
 Intelligence Star (Valor Award)
 Intelligence Medal of Merit
 Distinguished Career Intelligence Medal
 Career Intelligence Medal
 Career Commendation Medal
 Intelligence Commendation Medal
 Exceptional Service Medallion
 Hostile Action Service Medal
 Agency Seal Medal
 Director's Award
 Gold Retirement Medallion
 Silver Retirement Medallion
 Bronze Retirement Medallion

Department of Agriculture
The USDA’s Honor Awards is a tradition dating back to 1947 and represents the highest awards granted by the Secretary to an individual or group for contribution or achievement in support of the Department’s mission. Since 2018, the traditional honor awards program has been redesigned into a three-tier structure:
 Tier 3: Secretary's Honor Awards
 Tier 2: Under (or Assistant) Secretary's Awards
 Tier 1: Administrator's (or Chief's) Awards

Animal and Plant Health Inspection Service
 Distinguished Honor Award
 Superior Honor Award
 Meritorious Honor Award

Foreign Agricultural Service 
 Distinguished Honor Award
 Superior Honor Award
 Meritorious Honor Award

U.S. Forest Service 
 Distinguished Science Award 
 Early Career Scientist Award
 Science Delivery Award
 Strategic Goal Honor Awards
 Aldo Leopold Award for Overall Wilderness Stewardship Program
 Bob Marshall Award for Individual Champion of Wilderness Stewardship
 Bob Marshall Award for Group Champion of Wilderness Stewardship
 Wilderness Partnership Champion Award
 Excellence in Wilderness Stewardship Research Award
 Connie Myers Award for Leadership in Wilderness Education
 Line Officer Wilderness Leadership Award
 Outstanding Wild & Scenic River Stewardship
 Outstanding Wild & Scenic River Manager
 Outstanding Line Officer Leadership for Wild & Scenic Rivers

Department of Commerce
 Department of Commerce Gold Medal
 Department of Commerce Silver Medal
 Department of Commerce Bronze Medal
 President's "E" Award

National Institute of Standards and Technology
 Malcolm Baldrige National Quality Award
 Eugene Casson Crittenden Award
 Allen V. Astin Measurement Science Award
 Edward Uhler Condon Award
 Judson C. French Award
 Jacob Rabinow Applied Research Award
 Edward Bennett Rosa Award
 William P. Slichter Award
 Samuel Wesley Stratton Award
 George A. Uriano Award
 NIST Colleagues' Choice Award
 Director's Award for Excellence in Administration
 Equal Employment Opportunity/Diversity Award
 NIST Safety Award

National Oceanic and Atmospheric Administration

 NOAA Corps Meritorious Service Medal
 NOAA Administrator's Award
 NOAA Corps Commendation Medal
 NOAA Corps Achievement Medal
 NOAA Corps Director's Ribbon
 NOAA Units Citation Award
 NOAA Technology Transfer Award
 NOAA Distinguished Career Award

Non-government decorations

Non-governmental organizations
 Junior Officer of the Year = NOAA ACO Award Medal (without attachments)
 Science Award = NOAA ACO Award Medal (with bronze "S" device)
 Engineering Award = NOAA ACO Award Medal (with bronze "E" device)
 Society of American Military Engineers' Colbert Medal
 Society of American Military Engineers Karo Award

Campaign and service awards
 NOAA Corps National Response Deployment Medal
 NOAA Corps Outstanding Volunteer Service Award Medal
 NOAA Sea Service Deployment Ribbon
 NOAA Corps Atlantic Sea Service Ribbon
 NOAA Corps Pacific Sea Service Ribbon
 NOAA Corps Mobile Duty Service Ribbon
 NOAA Corps International Service Ribbon
 NOAA Corps National Response Service Ribbon
 NOAA Rifle Ribbon (no longer awarded)
 NOAA Pistol Ribbon (no longer awarded)

Coast and Geodetic Survey

 Coast and Geodetic Survey Distinguished Service Ribbon
 Coast and Geodetic Survey Meritorious Service Ribbon
 Coast and Geodetic Survey Good Conduct Ribbon
 Coast and Geodetic Survey Defense Service Ribbon
 Coast and Geodetic Survey Atlantic War Zone Ribbon
  Coast and Geodetic Survey Pacific War Zone Ribbon

Department of Defense

Department of Defense awards for civilian service
 Department of Defense Distinguished Civilian Service Award
 Secretary of Defense Meritorious Civilian Service Award
 Department of Defense David O. Cooke Excellence in Public Administration Award

Office of the Secretary of Defense-level awards for civilian service
 Office of the Secretary of Defense Exceptional Civilian Service Award
 Office of the Secretary of Defense Civilian Career Service Award
 Office of the Secretary of Defense Medal for Valor
 Secretary of Defense Medal for the Defense of Freedom
 Civilian Desert Shield/Desert Storm Medal
 Secretary of Defense Medal for the Global War on Terrorism
 Armed Forces Civilian Service Medal (AFCSM)
 Office of the Secretary of Defense Award for Excellence
 Office of the Secretary of Defense Group Achievement Award

Office of the Secretary of Defense-level awards for private citizens
 Department of Defense Medal for Distinguished Public Service
 Secretary of Defense Medal for Outstanding Public Service
 Secretary of Defense Medal for Exceptional Public Service
 Eugene G. Fubini Award

Joint Chiefs of Staff
 CJCS Award for Distinguished Public Service (DPS)
 CJCS Award for Outstanding Public Service (OPS)
 CJCS Joint Distinguished Civilian Service Award (JDSCA)
 CJCS Joint Meritorious Civilian Service Award (JMCSA), its military equivalent is the Defense Meritorious Service Medal
 Joint Civilian Service Commendation Award (JCSCA), its military equivalent is the Joint Service Commendation Medal
 Joint Civilian Service Achievement Award (JCSAA), its military equivalent is the Joint Service Achievement Medal

Civilian Personnel Management Service
 Exceptional Civilian Service Award
 Meritorious Civilian Service Award
 Outstanding Civilian Career Service Award

Defense Acquisition University
 Defense Acquisition University President's Medal
 Defense Acquisition University Superior Civilian Service Medal
 Defense Acquisition University Civilian Achievement Medal

Defense Advanced Research Projects Agency
 DARPA Distinguished Civilian Service Medal
 DARPA Superior Civilian Service Medal
 DARPA Meritorious Civilian Service Medal
 DARPA Distinguished Public Service Medal
 DARPA Superior Public Service Medal
 DARPA Meritorious Public Service Medal
 DARPA Honorable Service Medal
 Game Changer Award Medallion

DOD Office of the Inspector General (OIG)
 DOD Inspector General Distinguished Service Award
 DOD Inspector General Superior Civilian Service Award
 DOD Inspector General Meritorious Civilian Service Award

Defense Investigative Service
 Defense Investigative Service Exceptional Civilian Service Award
 Defense Investigative Service Meritorious Civilian Service Award

Defense POW/MIA Accounting Agency
 Director's Meritorious Civilian Service Award
 Director's Commendation for Civilian Service 
 Director's Civilian Achievement Award
 DPAA Operational Team Service Medal
 DPAA Distinguished Public Service Medal
 DPAA Superior Public Service Medal

Department of the Army

Department of the Army Civilian Service Decorations
 Department of the Army Distinguished Civilian Service Award
 Secretary of the Army Award for Valor
 Meritorious Civilian Service Award
 Superior Civilian Service Award
 Department of the Army Civilian Service Commendation Medal (formerly the Commander's Award for Civilian Service)
 Department of the Army Civilian Service Achievement Medal
 Secretary of the Army's Award for Outstanding Achievement in Materiel Acquisition

Department of the Army Civilian Service Medals
 Civilian Award for Humanitarian Service
 Secretary of Defense Medal for the Global War on Terrorism
 Armed Forces Civilian Service Medal (AFCSM)

Department of the Army Public Service Decorations
 Distinguished Public Service Medal
 Superior Public Service Medal
 Meritorious Public Service Medal
 Public Service Commendation Medal (formerly the Commander's Award for Public Service)
 Patriotic Public Service Lapel Button
 Certificate of Appreciation for Patriotic Civilian Service

Department of the Air Force
 Air Force Decoration for Exceptional Civilian Service
 Outstanding Civilian Career Service Award
 Civilian Award for Valor
 Meritorious Civilian Service Award
 Command Civilian Award for Valor
 Exemplary Civilian Service Award
 Civilian Achievement Award
 Civilian Air Medal
 Civilian Aerial Achievement Award

Awards for non-governmental personnel
 Secretary of the Air Force Distinguished Public Service Award
 Chief of Staff of the Air Force Award for Exceptional Public Service
 Air Force Exceptional Service Award
 Air Force Scroll of Appreciation
 Commander's Public Service Award

Department of the Navy
 Distinguished Civilian Service Award
 Superior Civilian Service Award
 Meritorious Civilian Service Award
 Civilian Service Commendation Medal
 Civilian Service Achievement Medal
 Distinguished Civilian Medal for Valor
 Superior Civilian Medal for Valor
 Angela M. Houtz Medal for Fallen Civilians
 Captain Robert Dexter Conrad Award for Scientific Achievement
 Distinguished Achievement in Science Award
 Distinguished Public Service Award
 Superior Public Service Award
 Meritorious Public Service Award

Military Sealift Command
 Military Sealift Command Civilian Service Commendation Medal
 Military Sealift Command Civilian Service Achievement Medal
 Military Sealift Command Civilian Humanitarian Service Medal

Defense Commissary Agency
 Defense Commissary Agency Distinguished Civilian Service Award
  DeCA Meritorious Civilian Service Award
  DeCA Superior Civilian Service Award
  DeCA Civilian Career Service Award

Defense Contract Audit Agency
 Distinguished Civilian Service Medal
 Meritorious Civilian Service Medal

Defense Contract Management Agency (DCMA)
 DCMA Distinguished Civilian Service Award
 DCMA Exceptional Civilian Service Award
 DCMA Meritorious Civilian Service Award
 DCMA Civilian Career Service Award

Defense Information Systems Agency
  DISA Exceptional Civilian Service Medal
  DISA Meritorious Civilian Service Medal

Defense Intelligence Agency
 DIA Leadership Award
 DIA Exceptional Civilian Service Medal
 DIA Excellent Service Medal
 DIA Civilian Achievement Medal
 DIA Meritorious Civilian Service Medal
 DIA Director's Award
 DIA Civilian Combat Support Medal
 DIA Civilian Expeditionary Medal

Defense Logistics Agency
 DLA Distinguished Career Service Award
 DLA Superior Civilian Service Award
 DLA Meritorious Civilian Service Award
 DLA Exceptional Civilian Service Award
 DLA Humanitarian Service Medal

Defense Supply Agency
 DSA Exceptional Civilian Service Award

Defense Technical Information Center
 DTIC Exceptional Civilian Service Award
 DTIC Meritorious Civilian Service Award

Defense Threat Reduction Agency (DTRA)
 DTRA Distinguished Service Award
 DTRA Meritorious Service Award
 DTRA Exceptional Service Award
 DTRA Honorable Civilian Service Medal

Formerly the Defense Special Weapons Agency (DSWA) Awards
 DSWA Director's Lifetime Achievement Award
 DSWA Exceptional Civilian Service Award
 DSWA Meritorious Civilian Service Award

National Geospatial-Intelligence Agency

 NIMA or NGA Distinguished Civilian Service Medal
 NIMA or NGA Meritorious Civilian Service Medal
 NIMA or NGA Superior Civilian Service Medal
 NIMA or NGA Meritorious Unit Citation

National Reconnaissance Office
 NRO Distinguished Service Medal (Gold Medal)
 NRO Superior Service Medal (Silver Medal)
 NRO Meritorious Service Medal (Bronze Medal)
 NRO Director's Circle Award

National Security Agency
 NSA Distinguished Civilian Service Medal
 NSA Superior Civilian Service Medal
 NSA Meritorious Civilian Service Medal
 NSA Civilian Service Achievement Medal
 NSA Civilian Valor Medal
 NSA Leadership Medallion
 NSA Innovation Medallion
 NSA National Security Medallion
 NSA Citizenship Medallion
 NSA Foreign Partnership Medallion
 NSA Public Service Medallion
 NSA Exceptional Civilian Service Medal (no longer awarded)

Uniformed Services University of the Health Sciences
 USUHS Distinguished Service Medal
 USUHS Exceptional Service Medal
 USUHS Outstanding Service Medal
 USUHS Commendable Service Medal
 USUHS Medal of Achievement

Department of Education

Employee awards
 Secretary's Golden Apple Award
 Secretary's Executive Leadership Award
 Secretary's Supervisory Leadership Award
 Secretary's Innovation Award
 Secretary's Customer Service Award
 Secretary's Teamwork Award
 Secretary's Diversity and Inclusion Award
 Secretary's Collaboration Award
 ED Peer Recognition Award
 James P. Keenan Award

Public awards

 Presidential Scholar Medallion
 President's Education Awards Program (PEAP)
 PEAP—Excellence Award for Elementary Schools (with Certificate and Gold Seal in Blue Pin)
 PEAP—Excellence Award for Middle Schools (with Certificate and Gold Seal in Red Pin)
 PEAP—Excellence Award for High Schools (with Certificate and Gold Seal in Black Pin)
 PEAP—Achievement Award for Elementary, Middle and High Schools (with Certificate and Silver Seal in White Pin)
 National Blue Ribbon Schools Program
 National Green Ribbon Schools Program

Department of Energy

Honor awards 
 The James R. Schlesinger Award
 Secretary of Energy's Excellence Award
 Secretary of Energy's Achievement Award

Appreciation awards 
 Secretary of Energy’s Appreciation Award
 Secretary of Energy’s Appreciation Award for Management Excellence

Departure awards 
 Secretary of Energy's Exceptional Service Award
 Secretary of Energy's Distinguished Service Award
 Secretary of Energy's Meritorious Service Award

Departmental awards 
 Safety System Oversight (SSO) Annual Award
 Facility Representative of the Year Award
 Locally Employed Staff (LES)/Foreign Service National (FSN) of the Year Award

Inactive and obsolete awards 
 DOE Award for Valor
 DOE Secretary's Award
 DOE Exceptional Service Medal
 DOE Meritorious Service Award

Department of Health and Human Services
 Secretary's Award for Distinguished Service
 Secretary's Award for Meritorious Service
 HHS Distinguished Public Service Award
 HHS Award for Excellence in Management
 Hubert H. Humphrey Award for Service to America
 HHS Career Achievement Award
 Secretary's Recognition Award
 Secretary's Special Citation
 Secretary's Certificate of Appreciation
 Secretary's Letter of Appreciation
 Superior Accomplishment Award - Special Act or Service
 Superior Accomplishment Award - Suggestions
 Superior Accomplishment Award - Inventions

U.S. Public Health Service
For authorized uniformed service awards of the U.S. Public Health Service Commissioned Corps, visit “Awards and decorations of the Public Health Service"

 Assistant Secretary for Health's Exceptional Service Medal (can be awarded to a member of any uniformed service or a civilian) 
 Surgeon General's Medallion (can be awarded to a member of any uniformed service or a civilian)
 Public Health Service COVID-19 Pandemic Civilian Service Award Medal

National Institutes of Health
 NIH Director's Award – Scientific/Medical
 NIH Director's Award – Technical/Clerical/Support
 NIH Director's Award – Administrative
 NIH Director's Award – Mentoring

Office of the Assistant Secretary for Preparedness and Response
 D.A. Henderson Lifetime Achievement Medal
 Investor in People Leadership Award Medal
 Pinnacle Award Medal
 Superior Contribution Medal
 Pledge to Excellence Medal

Centers for Disease Control and Prevention (CDC) / Agency for Toxic Substances and Disease Registry (ATSDR)
 CDC/ATSDR William Watson Medal of Excellence (no ribbon)

President's Council on Fitness, Sports, and Nutrition
 PSA Presidential Sports Award (with Certificate, Medal and Emblem)
 PCA-P Presidential Champions Platinum Award (with Certificate, Medallion and Citation)
 PCA-G Presidential Champions Gold Award (with Certificate, Medal, Pin and Emblem)
 PCA-S Presidential Champions Silver Award (with Certificate, Medal, Pin and Emblem)
 PCA-B Presidential Champions Bronze Award (with Certificate, Medal, Pin and Emblem)
 PALA+ Presidential Active Lifestyle Award (with Certificate, Pin and Emblem)
 PYFA Presidential Youth Fitness Award (with Certificate, Medal and Emblem)
 Pr-PFA Presidential Physical Fitness Award (with Certificate and Emblem)
 N-PFA National Physical Fitness Award (with Certificate and Emblem)
 P-PFA Participant Physical Fitness Award (with Certificate and Emblem)
 HFA Health Fitness Award (with Certificate and Emblem)

Most of these awards were terminated 30 June 2018.

Department of Homeland Security
 Secretary's Exceptional Service Gold Medal
 Secretary's Meritorious Service Silver Medal
 Homeland Security Distinguished Public Service Medal
 Secretary's Award for Leadership Excellence
 Secretary's Award for Valor
 Secretary’s Unity of Effort Award
 Secretary's Award for Exemplary Service
 Secretary's Award for Excellence
 Secretary's Unit Award
 Secretary's Award for Diversity Management
 Secretary's Award for Volunteer Service
 DHS Outstanding Unit Award

U.S. Customs and Border Protection
 Border Patrol Newton-Azrak Award
 Medal of Honor for Heroism Award
 Meritorious Service Award for Valor
 Border Patrol Purple Cross
 Commissioner’s Leadership Award
 Commissioner’s Invictus Award
 Commissioner’s Integrity Award
 Commissioner’s Blue Eagle Award
 CBP Community Service Award
 Commissioner’s Unit Citation Award
 Commissioner’s Distinguished Career Service Award (Proposed in 2002, Never Authorized)
 Commissioner’s Exceptional Service Medal (Proposed in 2002, Never Authorized)
 Commissioner’s Meritorious Service Award (Proposed in 2002, Never Authorized)
 Commissioner’s Special Commendation Award (Proposed in 2002, Never Authorized)
 Border Patrol Chief's Commendation (Awarded from 2002 to 2004)
 Border Patrol Excellence in Group Achievement (Proposed in 2002, Never Authorized)
 Border Patrol Academy Honor Graduate Medal (Proposed in 2002, Never Authorized)
 Border Patrol Long Service Medal (Proposed in 2002, Never Authorized)
 Border Patrol 75th Anniversary Medal (No Longer Authorized for Wear)

Federal Emergency Management Agency
 FEMA Distinguished Service Medal
 Secretary's Award For Distinguished Public Safety Service (may be awarded by the Attorney General or FEMA Director)

Federal Law Enforcement Training Centers 
 FLETC Honor Graduate of the Year Award
 FLETC Director’s Life Saving Award
 Federal Law Enforcement Training Accreditation (FLETA) Team Leader Recognition Award
 FLETA Agency Leadership Recognition Award

U.S. Coast Guard
For authorized military awards, visit "Awards and decorations of the United States Coast Guard"

 Gold Lifesaving Medal
 Silver Lifesaving Medal

Civilian Service Awards 
 Commandant's Superior Achievement Award
 Commandant's Distinguished Career Service Award
 Coast Guard Civilian Employee of the Year Award
 Coast Guard Civilian Service Commendational Medal
 Coast Guard Certificate of Appreciation
 Coast Guard Official Letter of Commendation

Public Service Awards 
 Coast Guard Distinguished Public Service Award
 Coast Guard Meritorious Public Service Award
  Coast Guard Public Service Commendation
  Coast Guard Certificate of Merit
  Coast Guard Certificate of Appreciation

U.S. Secret Service
 Director's Award of Valor
 Director's Lifesaving Award
 Director's Impact Award
 Director's Distinguished Service Award
Director's Yes Award

Transportation Security Administration
 John W. Magaw Leadership Values Award
 Gale D. Rossides People First Award
 Gerardo Hernandez In The Line Of Duty Service Award
 Distinguished Career Service Award

Department of the Interior

Honor Awards
 Distinguished Service Award
 Meritorious Service Award
 Unit Award for Excellence of Service
 Superior Service Award
 Citizen's Award for Exceptional Service
 Secretary's Award for Outstanding Contribution to Aviation Safety

Heroic Act Honor Awards
 Valor Award
 Citizen's Award for Bravery
 Exemplary Act Award

Other Honor Awards
 Departmental Unsung Hero Award
 Secretary's Diversity Award
 Environmental Achievement Award
 Award of Merit (Safety)
 Professional Service Award (Safety)
 Outstanding Service Award (for Political Appointees)
 Partners in Conservation Award

Department of Justice
 Public Safety Officer Medal of Valor (awarded by the President to public safety officers cited by the Attorney General)
 Law Enforcement Congressional Badge of Bravery—Federal
 Law Enforcement Congressional Badge of Bravery—State and Local
 Secretary's Award For Distinguished Public Safety Service (may be awarded by the Attorney General or FEMA Director)
 Attorney General's Award for Exceptional Service
 Attorney General's Award for Exceptional Heroism
 Mary C. Lawton Lifetime Service Award
 William French Smith Award for Outstanding Contributions to Cooperative Law Enforcement
 Edward H. Levi Award for Outstanding Professionalism and Exemplary Integrity
 Attorney General's Award for Meritorious Public Service
 Attorney General's Award for Distinguished Service
 Attorney General's Distinguished Service Award—Criminal Investigation
 Attorney General's Distinguished Service Award—Field Operations
 Attorney General's Distinguished Service Award—Community Policing Innovations
 Attorney General's Award for Excellence in Law Enforcement
 Attorney General's Award for Excellence in Management
 Attorney General's Award for Excellence in Information Technology
 Attorney General's Award for Excellence in Furthering the Interests of U.S. National Security
 Attorney General's Award for Excellence in Legal Support
 Attorney General's Award for Excellence in Administrative Support
 John Marshall Awards
 Attorney General's Award for Outstanding Service in Freedom of Information Act Administration
 Attorney General's Award for Fraud Prevention
 Attorney General's Award for Outstanding Contributions to Community Partnerships for Public Safety
 Attorney General's Award for Outstanding Service by a Federal Wage System Employee
 Attorney General's Award for Outstanding Contributions by a New Employee
 Young American Award; transferred to the Boy Scouts of America in 1971

Bureau of Alcohol, Tobacco, Firearms, and Explosives
 ATF Distinguished Service Medal
 ATF Gold Star Medal
 ATF Medal of Valor

Drug Enforcement Administration
 DEA Purple Heart Award

Federal Bureau of Investigation

 FBI Star
 FBI Medal for Meritorious Achievement
 FBI Shield of Bravery
 FBI Medal of Valor
 FBI Memorial Star

Federal Bureau of Prisons
 Federal Bureau of Prisons Distinguished Service Medal (Gold Medal)
 Federal Bureau of Prisons Meritorious Service Medal (Silver Medal)
 Federal Bureau of Prisons Commendable Service Medal (Bronze Medal)

Department of State

Honor Awards
 Secretary's Distinguished Service Award
 Secretary’s Award
 Award for Heroism
 Award for Valor
 Thomas Jefferson Star for Foreign Service
 Distinguished Honor Award
 Superior Honor Award
 Meritorious Honor Award
 Richard C. Holbrooke Award for Diplomacy
 Presidential Award for Extraordinary Efforts to Combat Trafficking in Persons
 Franklin Award

Service Awards
 Expeditionary Service Award
 Vietnam Civilian Service Award
 Secretary's Career Achievement Award
 John Jacob Rogers Award

Arms Control and Disarmament Agency
 Distinguished Honor Award
 Superior Honor Award
 Meritorious Honor Award

United States Information Agency (Defunct agency)
 Distinguished Honor Award
 Superior Honor Award
 Meritorious Honor Award

Department of Transportation
 Secretary of Transportation Outstanding Achievement Medal
 Department of Transportation Meritorious Achievement Medal
 Department of Transportation Superior Achievement Medal
 Department of Transportation Medal for Valor
 Guardian Medal
 Transportation 9-11 Medal
 Transportation 9-11 Ribbon
 Secretary of Transportation Outstanding Unit Award
 Commercial Astronaut Wings

Federal Aviation Administration
 FAA Valor Medal
 FAA Wright Brothers Master Pilot Award
 FAA Charles Taylor Master Mechanic Award
 FAA Pilot Proficiency Award Program
 General Aviation Awards Program

Maritime Administration
 Distinguished Service Medal
 Meritorious Service Medal
 Outstanding Achievement Medal
 Gallant Ship Citation
 Mariner's Medal
 Combat Bar
 Defense Medal
 Atlantic War Zone Medal
 Mediterranean-Middle East War Zone
 Pacific War Zone Medal
 World War II Victory Medal
 Korean Service Medal
 Vietnam Service Medal
 Expeditionary Medal

Department of the Treasury
 Alexander Hamilton Award

 Albert Gallatin Award
 Distinguished Service Award

 Meritorious Service Award
 Secretary's Honor Award
 Assistant Secretary for Public Affairs Certificate of Distinguished Service

Internal Revenue Service
 IRS Commissioner's Award

Office of Thrift Supervision
 OTS Director's Award for Excellence

American Battle Monuments Commission
 Distinguished Service Service Ribbon
 Superior Service Service Ribbon
 Meritorious Service Service Ribbon
 Commendable Service Ribbon
 Distinguished Public Service Service Ribbon
 Superior Public Service Service Ribbon
 Meritorious Public Service Ribbon

Broadcasting Board of Governors
 Distinguished Honor Award
 David Burke Distinguished Journalism Award

Environmental Protection Agency
 EPA Gold Medal for Exceptional Service (individual and group)
 EPA Silver Medal for Superior Service (individual and group)
 EPA Bronze Medal for Commendable Service (individual and group)
 EPA Distinguished Career Service Award
 Paul G. Keough Award for Administrative Excellence
 Glenda A. Farmer Award for Exemplary Technical Support
 Trudy A. Speciner Non-Supervisory Award for Advancing Environmental Protection
 President's Environmental Youth Award

General Services Administration

 Administrator’s Distinguished Service Award
 Administrator’s Meritorious Service Award
 Administrator’s Excellence in Performance Award
 Administrator’s Exceptional Service Award
 Head of Service or Staff Office or Regional Administrator Exceptional Service Award
 Commendable Service Award
 GSA Design Excellence Award in Federal Architecture
 Travel & Relocation Excellence Award
 GSA Gold Star Award for Excellence in Implementing the Federal Computers for Learning Program (Executive Order 12999)
 Miles Romney Achievement Award for Innovation in Personal Property Management
 Bob Baker Fleet Manager of the Year Awards program
 GSA Federal Aviation Program Awards program
 GSA Achievement Award for Real Property Best Practices and Innovation
 GSA Federal Mail Best Practices Awards program

National Aeronautics and Space Administration (NASA)

 Congressional Space Medal of Honor (astronauts only)
 Distinguished Service Medal
 Distinguished Public Service Medal
 Outstanding Leadership Medal
 Outstanding Service Medal (obsolete)
 Outstanding Public Leadership Medal
 Exceptional Service Medal
 Exceptional Public Service Medal
 Exceptional Bravery Medal
 Exceptional Engineering Achievement Medal
 Exceptional Scientific Achievement Medal
 Exceptional Technology Achievement Medal
 Equal Employment Opportunity Medal
 Exceptional Administrative Achievement Medal
 Exceptional Achievement Medal
 Exceptional Public Achievement Medal
 Early Career Achievement Medal
 Silver Achievement Medal
 NASA Group Achievement Award
 Space Flight Medal (astronauts only)
 Space Exploration Medal

National Science Foundation (NSF)
 Antarctic Service Medal
 Presidential Award for Excellence in Mathematics and Science Teaching (PAEMST)
 Presidential Award for Excellence in Science, Mathematics and Engineering Mentoring (PAESMEM)
 Vannevar Bush Award
 NSB Public Service Award

Office of Personnel Management (OPM) 
 OPM Meritorious Service Medal

Selective Service System
 Selective Service System Distinguished Service Medal
 Selective Service System Exceptional Service Medal
 Selective Service System Meritorious Service Medal
 Selective Service System World War II Service Medal

Small Business Administration (SBA) 
 Small Business Person of the Year 
 Small Business Exporter of the Year
 Jody C. Raskind Microlender of the Year
 Small Business Investment Company of the Year
 SCORE Chapter of the Year

Awards to SBA Resource Partners 
 Small Business Development Center (SBDC) Excellence and Innovation Award
 Women’s Business Center of Excellence Award
 Veterans Business Outreach Center Excellence in Service Award

Phoenix Awards for Disaster Recovery 
 Outstanding Small Business Disaster Recovery
 Outstanding Contributions to Disaster Recovery — Public Official
 Outstanding Contributions to Disaster Recovery — Volunteer

Federal Procurement Awards 
 Small Business Prime Contractor of the Year
 Small Business Subcontractor of the Year
 8(a) Graduate of the Year
 Dwight D. Eisenhower Awards for Excellence

President's Council on Year 2000 Conversion
 Y2K Service Medal

United States Agency for International Development
 Distinguished Honor Award
 Superior Honor Award
 Meritorious Honor Award

References

Civil awards and decorations of the United States